Bahour Lake (French: Lac Bahour) is the second largest lake in the Indian union territory of Puducherry This lake is recognized as one of the Important Bird Areas (IBA) of Puducherry

References

Lakes of Puducherry